"When It's Moonlight On The Prairie" is a popular song published in 1908 with lyrics by Robert F. Roden and music by S.R. Henry. The lyrics tell of a cowboy eloping with his Mary. The chorus is:

"When It's Moonlight on the Prairie" has been recorded many times.

References

Bibliography
Roden, Robert F. (w.); Henry, S.R. (m.). "When It's Moonlight On The Prairie" (Sheet music). New York: Jos. W. Stern & Co. (1908).

External links
"When It's Moonlight On The Prairie", Byron G. Harlan (Edison Gold Moulded 9850, 1908)—Cylinder Preservation and Digitization Project.

1908 songs